Petroio is a village in Tuscany, central Italy, administratively a frazione of the comune of Trequanda, province of Siena. At the time of the 2001 census its population was 335.

Petroio is about 50 km from Siena and 7 km from Trequanda.

References 

Frazioni of the Province of Siena